Cirillo  Pagani (11 October 1911 – 19 October 2003), nicknamed "Nello", was an Italian Grand Prix motorcycle road racer and Formula One driver. He was born in Milan, Lombardy, and died in Bresso.

He was known for his long career, spanning from 1928 to 1955, and for becoming the first 125cc World Champion in the inaugural 1949 campaign. He almost became a double Champion in that first year of the World Championship series. In the 500cc class he was officially runner-up. The series was run over six rounds with a rider's best three scores counting towards the championship. Englishman Les Graham on an AJS was Pagani's main rival. Although Pagani scored more overall points than Graham, he lost the championship with two wins and a third place as his scores that counted, whilst Graham had two wins and a second.

Pagani's car racing exploits resulted in wins at the Pau Grand Prix in 1947 and 1948, before his single Formula One World Championship Grand Prix, on 4 June 1950, in the 1950 Swiss Grand Prix at Bremgarten. He finished seventh and scored no championship points. He also finished fourth in the Modena Grand Prix that year, driving a Simca-Gordini.

In 1952 Pagani finished second in class in the Mille Miglia, driving an OSCA but was more involved with motorcycle racing and became the manager of the MV Agusta team.

He was the father of Alberto Pagani, who was also a racing motorcyclist.

Motorcycle Grand Prix results 
1949 point system:

Points system from 1950 to 1968:

5 best results were counted up until 1955.

(key) (Races in italics indicate fastest lap)

Complete Formula One World Championship results
(key)

References 

Italian motorcycle racers
Italian racing drivers
Italian Formula One drivers
125cc World Championship riders
500cc World Championship riders
Isle of Man TT riders
Sportspeople from Milan
1911 births
2003 deaths
Grand Prix drivers
125cc World Riders' Champions